WRMF (97.9 FM) is a commercial radio station in Palm Beach, Florida.  It serves the West Palm Beach, Florida radio market.  The station airs a hot adult contemporary radio format and is owned by Hubbard Broadcasting.  The studios and offices are on Northpoint Parkway in West Palm Beach.  For the past three decades, WRMF has been at or close to #1 in the West Palm Beach radio market ratings.

WRMF has an effective radiated power of 100,000 watts.  The transmitter is in Lake Worth, west of U.S. Route 441.  WRMF is licensed to broadcast in the HD Radio digital format.  The HD2 subchannel simulcasts the talk radio format on sister station WFTL, while the HD3 subchannel carries Haitian Creole talk and contemporary hits from co-owned WPBR.

History

WQXT-FM, WWOS
On March 17, 1957, the station signed on as WQXT-FM, the FM counterpart to WQXT (now WPBR), under the ownership of the Flame Radio & TV Corporation.. They simulcast a full service middle of the road format of adult popular music and news, with national shows from the ABC Radio Network.  The studios were located on Lake Worth Beach.

In 1963, WQXT-AM-FM were sold to Fairfax Broadcasting.  The following year, the FM station's call sign was changed to WWOS, standing for "Wonderful World of Stereo," when the station began broadcasting in FM stereo full time.  In 1971, the simulcast with WQXT ended, as WWOS switched to Progressive Rock using the call letters WMUM for "The Mother."

WJNO-FM, WRMF
The station was sold in 1971 to Robert M. Weeks, who also owned WJNO (now WBZT).  The FM station became WJNO-FM, "J-98", switching to an album rock format.

WJNO-AM-FM were acquired by Richard M. Fairbanks in July 1979.  The FM station's call letters were changed to WRMF in January 1980, representing the owner's initials. Nearly a year later in December 1980, WRMF dropped its album rock format and switched to an adult contemporary format. When the 1990s rolled along, its format would later begin picking up the tempo and its format moved into a hot adult contemporary format by the middle of the decade.

Alpha and Hubbard ownership
In the 2010s, WRMF was acquired by Alpha Media, based in Portland, Oregon.  On September 27, 2018, Alpha Media agreed to sell its cluster in West Palm Beach to Hubbard Radio. The sale, at a price of $88 million, was consummated on January 23, 2019.

Shows 
 The KVJ Show - Weekdays and Saturdays from 6am-10am
 Randi West - Weekdays from 10am-2pm
 Jeff Miles-Weekdays from 2pm-6pm
 KVJ Replay 6pm
 Suits 7pm-midnight 
 South Florida Sunday - Sundays from 6-7am (public affairs)

References

External links
WRMF official website

RMF
Hot adult contemporary radio stations in the United States
1957 establishments in Florida
Radio stations established in 1957
Hubbard Broadcasting